Rosemount may refer to:

Place names

Australia
 Rosemount, Queensland

Canada
 Rural Municipality of Rosemount No. 378, Saskatchewan

Ireland
 Rosemount, County Westmeath, an area in the Southwest of Westmeath

United Kingdom
 Rosemount, Aberdeen, an area of the Scottish city of Aberdeen
 Rosemount, County Down, a townland in County Down, Northern Ireland
 Rosemount, Derry, an area of Derry, Northern Ireland
 Rosemount, Perth and Kinross, a location in Scotland

United States
 Rosemount (Forkland, Alabama), a plantation in Forkland, Alabama, listed on the NRHP in Alabama
 Rosemount Museum, a historic house museum in Pueblo, Colorado, listed on the NRHP
 Rosemount, Minnesota
 Rosemount, Ohio

Other uses
 Rosemount (wine), an Australian brandname owned by Treasury Wine Estates
 Rosemount Inc., a manufacturer of industrial process measurement devices, and Rosemount Engineering, the original name of the company
 Rosemount International School, Singapore
 Rosemount Primary School, in Rosemount, Ohio

See also
Rosemont (disambiguation)